Tom Kingston may refer to:
 Tom Kingston (rugby union) (born 1991), Australian rugby player
 Tom Kingston (hurler) (born 1967), Irish hurler
 Tom Kingston (rugby league)  (born 1988), Australian rugby league player

See also
 Tom Hingston (born 1973), British graphic designer and creative director
 Tom Kingsford (1928–2005), American football player and coach